The Datatron is a family of decimal vacuum tube computers developed by ElectroData Corporation and first shipped in 1954. The Datatron was later marketed by Burroughs Corporation after Burroughs acquired ElectroData in 1956. The Burroughs models of this machine were still in use into the 1960s.

History
Consolidated Electrodynamics Corporation (CEC), ElectroData's parent corporation, first pre-announced the Datatron in 1952 as the "CEC 30-201". Known also as CEC 30-203 (ElectroData 203), ElectroData 204 or 205, Burroughs 205 (different names signify the development and addition of new peripherals).

The first systems  were equipped with an "Electrodata 203" processor and were shipped to the Jet Propulsion Laboratory 
(JPL) and the National Bureau of Standards (NBS) in 1954. That same year design began on the "30-240" processor, enhanced to support magnetic tape. The name "Datatron" was first used in 1955.

Description
The Datatron has a word size of ten decimal digits plus a sign. Character data occupies two digits per character. A magnetic drum is used for memory. The drum rotates at 3570 rotations per minute (RPM) and stores 4000 words on 20 tracks (called bands). A later model, the Burroughs 220, added a small amount of magnetic core memory. A later model, the Datatron 205 was sold by Burroughs as the Burroughs 205.

References

External links
 
 Photo of Datatron system at Georgia Institute of Technology in 1959
 ElectroData/Burroughs Datatron 205 Emulator

1950s computers
Vacuum tube computers
Decimal computers